Atul Kohli is a professor of politics and international affairs at Woodrow Wilson School of Public and International Affairs, Princeton University.

Education and Career
Kohli was promoted to full professor in 1991, and was also appointed as David K.E. Bruce Professor of International Affairs at Princeton in 2002. Kohli is also the Editor in Chief of the journal of World Politics. In addition, he served as the Vice President of the American Political Science Association from 2009 to 2010. 

Kohli completed his Bachelors in Sociology and Mathematics, and a Masters in International Affairs from Carleton University. He went on to obtain his PhD in Political Science at University of California, Berkeley in 1981. His principal research interests are in the areas of comparative political economy with a focus on developing countries. He has authored and edited several books on Indian development and the Indian state.

Books

Author

Editor / Co-editor / Co-author

References

Year of birth missing (living people)
Living people
American political scientists
Princeton University faculty
Carleton University alumni